Habronattus viridipes is a species of jumping spider that can be found in the eastern United States (west to Minnesota and Texas) and southern Canada.

Description
Its front legs are green.

Ecology
The males attract females by doing a "dance", and showing them their green front legs. If the female likes the dance, they will start to mate.

References

External links

Salticidae
Spiders described in 1846
Spiders of North America